Street Law (lit. "The Citizen Rebels") is a 1974 poliziotteschi film. It stars Franco Nero, Barbara Bach and was directed by Enzo G. Castellari.

Plot
Carlo Antonelli (Franco Nero) is an engineer from Genoa who is mugged. After the police drop their investigation, he decides to take justice into his own hands. The muggers beat him again, but a young robber helps him to take his revenge.

Cast
 Franco Nero as Carlo Antonelli
 Giancarlo Prete as Tommy
 Barbara Bach as Barbara
 Renzo Palmer as Inspector 
 Nazzareno Zamperla as Beard 
 Romano Puppo as Ringleader

Production
The film was shot at Incir-De Paolis in Rome and on location in Genoa.

According to Castellari the producer, Mario Cecchi Gori, did not want him to shoot the opening sequence the way he wanted due to budget constraints. Castellari circumvented this by shooting a little every day without pay and without a shooting permit, by agreement with the stuntmen and crew.

Releases
Street Law was released on 17 September 1974 in Italy, where it was distributed by and grossed 1,623,405,000 lire. The film's commercial success paved the way for the most critically panned subgenre of poliziotteschi, the vigilante film. Other vigilante films, such as Death Wish, had not yet been released in Italy.

The film was released in the United Kingdom under the title Vigilante II.

Footnotes

References

External links

1974 films
1970s Italian-language films
Films directed by Enzo G. Castellari

1970s crime action films
1970s vigilante films
1970s crime thriller films
1970s action thriller films
Poliziotteschi films
Italian crime action films
Italian vigilante films
Films set in Genoa
Films scored by Guido & Maurizio De Angelis
Films shot in Rome
1970s Italian films